The Madison Boulder is one of the largest known glacial erratics in North America and among the largest in the world; it is preserved in the  Madison Boulder Natural Area in Madison, New Hampshire. It was acquired by the state from the Kennett family in 1946. In 1970, Madison Boulder was designated as a National Natural Landmark by the National Park Service.

References

External links
Madison Boulder Natural Area New Hampshire Department of Natural and Cultural Resources

Glacial erratics of the United States
Landforms of Carroll County, New Hampshire
Rock formations of New Hampshire
National Natural Landmarks in New Hampshire
State parks of New Hampshire
Parks in Carroll County, New Hampshire
Protected areas established in 1946
1946 establishments in New Hampshire